The Metropolitan Cathedral of Sucre, also called Cathedral Basilica of Our Lady of Guadalupe is a cathedral of Sucre, formerly La Plata, Bolivia is the seat of the Roman Catholic Church in Bolivia. It was built between 1559 and 1712.

Music
Juan de Araujo, was maestro de capilla of the Cathedral of La Plata 1680–1712, training up four important criollo composers: Andrés Flores, Sebastián de los Ríos, Roque Jacinto de Chavarría, and Blas Tardío y Guzmán who himself was maestro from 1745.

References

Cathedral
Buildings and structures in Chuquisaca Department
Roman Catholic cathedrals in Bolivia
Roman Catholic churches completed in 1712
Andean Baroque architecture
Basilica churches in Bolivia
18th-century Roman Catholic church buildings in Bolivia